Charminar is a 2013 Kannada romantic drama film written and directed and produced by R. Chandru, featuring Prem Kumar and Meghana Gaonkar in the lead roles. The film deals with the life of a man in comparison with the famous monument Charminar in Hyderabad, that shows four important pillars including family, guru, friends and lover.

Charminar is produced by R. Chandru films and the soundtrack composed by a newcomer Hari, former Guitarist based out of Hyderabad. The film was remade in Telugu in 2015 as Krishnamma Kalipindi Iddarini and in Odia in 2015 as Gapa Hele bi Sata. The director had accused the 2018 Tamil movie 96 to have similarities with this movie.

Plot 
The film begins with a press meet for the launch of R. Chandru's film Charminar. At the press meet, Chandru states that Charminar is based on a true story and begins narrating the story. A group of childhood friends decide to have a class reunion of their school mates. They call various classmates, including their friend Mohana, who is working at a software company in US. After hearing the news, Mohana flies to India to attend the reunion; on the way, he reflects on his friends and his love life in his school days.

Past: As a village boy, Mohana and his troupe of friends were often mischievous, and Mohana especially initially planned on failing school and becoming a farmer with his father, but he instead stayed in school. One day, an intelligent girl named Radha transfers into Mohana's class. Mohana falls for Radha and becomes very studious. The two form a friendship and develop feelings for each other, but Mohana struggles to confess his love to Radha. One day in PUC, Mohana writes a love letter to Radha, but Radha's mother finds it and asks the school principal to take some action. 

The school principal tells Mohana to hide in a closet and calls Radha and asks her about love, to which Radha states that nothing is stronger than her love for her mother, which breaks Mohana's heart. The principal tells Mohana that his studies are more important and that he should let go of love. Mohana and Radha eventually drift apart, but rekindle their friendship in Bangalore, where both of them are going to college. In particular, Radha gifts Mohana a book about doing well with internals. However, Radha abruptly ends her studies because of her mother's illness, and notifies Mohana just before she leaves. Radha says she will return, but she never does.

Meanwhile, Mohana lands a good job and attributes it to Radha's gift. He gets promoted to a CEO position in the company's American branch, and gets his first salary. To celebrate, Mohana goes back to his village and gives gifts to his parents. He goes to Radha's house to give her a gift as well, but notices that her house is locked. He visits his principal, who confesses that he too loved someone and studied hard, but his love married someone else as her parents wanted her to be married to an engineer/doctor, not a professor. The principal advises Mohana to pursue his love so he does not follow the same failure. 

The next day, Mohana visits Radha with the intent to confess his love. However, Radha's mother wishes him to not do so, as Radha is a fatherless child and marrying her to Mohana would bring ill to Radha and Mohana's family, especially given Mohana's newfound stature. She begs Mohana to leave her daughter; Mohana reluctantly agrees and goes to America.

Present: The school reunion is underway, and Radha is nowhere to be seen. Mohana gives a heartfelt speech during the event, thanking all the teachers that helped the students to where they are today, and eventually concluding with an emotional thank-you to Radha, although he does not name her. Mohana opts to visit Radha at her house, where she is chopping vegetables on the floor. Mohana notes that Radha's mother had died, and she had to discontinue any further studies. 

To his shock, Mohana finds that Radha had lost her left leg. Radha explains that she and her mother were going to the hospital but they were hit by another car, killing Radha's mother on impact and crushing Radha's leg. Mohana confesses his love to Radha and states that from now on, he will be her support and will always be there for her, and Radha emotionally obliges.

After the flashback, Chandru states that Radha and Mohana have arrived to the press meet. After press photographs with the cast and crew, the film ends with the title clap by Shiva Rajkumar.

Cast
 Prem Kumar as Mohana
 Meghana Gaonkar as Radha
 Kumuda
 Rangayana Raghu
 Raju Talikoti
 Suresh Mangalore
 Padmini Prakash
 Gaurish akki 
 Gunavantha manju 
 Vidya murthy
 B. V. Radha 
 Mohan Juneja 
 Kaddi Vishwa 
 R. G. Vijayasarathi 
 Madhugiri Prakash

Production

Casting
Initially, actors Ganesh, Ajay Rao and Srinagar Kitty were considered to play the lead in the film. Ajay and Kitty have worked in Chandru's previous films, but both backed out citing prior commitments. Though Ganesh was ready to act in the film, Chandru could not afford the remuneration Ganesh had asked. Finally Prem was approached for the role and he accepted the offer. Meghana Gaonkar was chosen to play the lead female role of Radha.

Filming
Completing the two schedules of shooting director R Chandru is moving to Bidar, Bijapur, Sakleshpur and other locations for the songs, three days of shoot will be held in USA. The opening song for protagonist is shot there and in the ancient places like Hemagiri, Srirangapatna the sets were erected for the film disclosed R Chandru.

Soundtrack

The audio release of the movie was held on 14 December 2012 at Green House Raj Milan. R Chandru invited twenty plus teachers who taught him from alphabets and honored them with a shawl, memento, garland and fruit basket. Chandru honored his teachers from the chief guest from Sri Adhichunchanagiri Math while his father, brothers, actor Prem Kumar, Meghana Gaonkar, Kumudha joined the felicitation. 'Charminar' has music from newcomer Hari. lyricists Lokesh Krishna written lyrics for 5 songs beautifully and Mahesh Jeeva have written one song. The track "Radhe Radhe" & "Nanna yedeya gode mele" received extrodrinary appreciation and met with good reviews upon the release. The album consists of seven tracks.

Critical reception
Upon theatrical release, Charminar received generally positive reviews from critics. 

A critic from The Times of India gave the film a rating of four stars out of five and praised the director stating, "Director R Chandru has excellently captured the feelings of a youth who struggles to convey his feelings to his girlfriend." Srikanth Srinivasa of Rediff too gave the film a rating of 3.5/5 and wrote "R Chandru, who made Taj Mahal has exceeded expectations and surprised audiences with Charminar, which strikes an emotional chord with the audience". 

Y. Maheswara Reddy from DNA gave the film a rating of three stars out of five and wrote "The film focuses on the role of teachers in moulding students as better citizens, and the director deserves a pat on his back for conveying the message sensitively" . A Shardhha of The New Indian Express wrote "All songs are hummable, coming out by a newcomer, Hari, a former guitarist with the original score for the film by Gurukiran. KS Chandrashekar's cinematography is excellent with the movie having some cool visuals. A neat job by the editing desk. The Verdict: A humble effort which has brought Chandru back into spotlight". 

B S Srivani from Deccan Herald wrote "Her minimal expressions are sufficient for the character – her eyes doing most of the talking, like in the scene where the lovers unite. Chandru doesn’t preach but manages to put across his message effectively. Families can have a good outing at Charminar". A critic from News18 wrote "All the other artists have done their best. 'Radhey radhey' is the best pick among all the songs composed by Hari. 'Charminar' has a huge emotional appeal and will attract the family audience and youngsters". A critic from Bangalore Mirror wrote  "Prem and Meghana have justified their roles and within a few scenes dispel any misgivings. There are inconsistencies and many minor inattention to detail. Prem as a US Senate member is taking imagination too far. All pardoned for making a film that is worth more than a watch".

Box office 
It has completed 100 days at the box office.

References

External links
 

2013 films
2010s Kannada-language films
Indian romantic drama films
2013 romantic drama films
Kannada films remade in other languages
Films set in Hyderabad, India
Films shot in Hyderabad, India
Films directed by R. Chandru